The 1998 Hart Council election took place on 7 May 1998 to elect members of Hart District Council in Hampshire, England. One third of the council was up for election and the council stayed under no overall control.

After the election, the composition of the council was
Liberal Democrat 15
Conservative 14
Independent 6

Election result

Ward results

References

1998
1998 English local elections
1990s in Hampshire